The year 536 BC was a year of the pre-Julian Roman calendar. In the Roman Empire, it was known as year 218  Ab urbe condita. The denomination 536 BC for this year has been used since the early medieval period, when the Anno Domini calendar era became the prevalent method in Europe for naming years.

Events
Phrynaeus is appointed archon of Athens.

Births
 Min Sun, disciple of Confucius

Deaths

References

 
530s BC